Bulçesh is a village in the former municipality of Zall-Bastar in Tirana County, Albania. At the 2015 local government reform it became part of the municipality Tirana. Just to the north is Bovilla reservoir.

Demographic history 
Bulçesh (Bulshesh) is recorded in the Ottoman defter of 1467 as a settlement in the timar of Vilku in the nahiyah of Benda. The village was relatively small with a total of only four households represented by: Ishri Vuku, Gjon Llapshi, Gjon Kiraj, and Gjergj Shari.

References 

Populated places in Tirana
Villages in Tirana County